Schizopilia is a genus of cockroaches.

This genus contains the following species:
 Schizopilia fissicollis (Saussure 1864)
 Schizopilia neblinensis (Lindemann, 1971)

References

Cockroaches